Germany–Peru relations are the bilateral relations between Germany and Peru. The relations are described by the German Foreign Office as "close and friendly". Cooperation between Germany and Peru takes place at both the bilateral and multilateral level.

History 
The first German to arrive in Peru was the Nuremberg-born Conquistador Bartolomé Flores. He came to Peru in 1537 and was involved in the suppression of an Inca rebellion by the Spanish. In the 18th century, the Viceroyalty of Peru was visited by German Jesuits, who published travelogues. In 1890, Fürchtegott Leberecht von Nordenflycht arrived in Peru, where he headed a German mining commission that was supposed to reform mining and smelts in Peru. However, his work was hampered by corrupt authorities and ended in 1811. Nine years later, Clemens von Althaus was taken up by the troops of the South American freedom fighter General José de San Martín, and von Althaus later became a general himself in the Army of Peru.

Beginning in 1849, a law passed by Ramón Castilla allowed the immigration of Germans to Peru, and in 1856 German colonists were granted permission to settle in the Peruvian Amazon. In 1859, Kuno Damian von Schütz-Holzhausen founded a colony in Pozuzo. After an arduous crossing, 150 Tyroleans, Rhinelanders and Bavarians settled here. While German agricultural colonies were not very successful, German immigrants soon took an important role in trade and manufacturing. For example, the Gildemeister family, who immigrated from Bremen, dominated the sugar trade. Most German immigrants were unmarried men who often married into Peruvian families and were with time assimilated into the Spanish-speaking majority society.

In 1870, Theodor von Bunsen was appointed Consul General of the North German Confederation and later the German Empire in Peru, which was established soon after. In 1872, a German school was founded in Lima. In 1917, Peru broke off diplomatic relations with Germany during World War I under pressure from the Entente cordiale and the United States. Relations were resumed after the war in 1921. After Adolf Hitler came to power, some persecuted German Jews emigrated to Peru, including the lawyer Michael Siegel. During World War II, Peru remained neutral for a long time and only broke off diplomatic relations with Nazi Germany in January 1942 after the entry of the United States into the war. As a result, German assets in the country were confiscated. Shortly before the end of the war, Peru declared war on Germany in February 1945, although this had only symbolic significance.

The Federal Republic of Germany (FRG) opened a Embassy in Lima in 1952. The expropriation of German individuals and companies in Peru was lifted two years later by government decree. Bilateral relations were deepened in the 1960s, and Heinrich Lübke, President of the FRG, visited Peru in 1964. A cultural agreement was concluded two years later, and the German-Peruvian Chamber of Commerce and Industry was established in 1968. After the end of the Hallstein Doctrine, Peru also established diplomatic relations with the German Democratic Republic (GDR), who established an embassy in Lima. After German Reunification, Peru moved its embassy from Bonn to Berlin.

Economic exchange 
Both countries have established close economic ties, and a Free Trade Agreement between Peru and the European Union has been in place since 2011 and in force since 2013. The bilateral trade volume between Germany and Peru was $2.2 billion in 2021. Germany mainly exports chemicals and pharmaceutical products and industrial goods such as automobiles, auto parts, and machinery to Peru. In return, Germany imports mainly raw materials (copper, gold, and zinc) and foodstuffs (coffee, cocoa, and bananas) from Peru. Among the most important German foreign direct investments in Peru is the Lima Airport, in which Fraport AG owns shares.

Germany provides economic aid and technical assistance in Peru. The joint partnership focuses on the environment, good governance, and sustainable urban development to help the country move closer to OECD standards.

Culture and education 
There are numerous cultural contacts between Peru and Germany. In Pozuzo, there is a German-Austrian colony in the Andes, where many customs and aspects of German culture have been preserved. Since 2015, an increasing number of German-born Mennonites from Mexico and Belize founded new colonies in Peru. There is a Goethe Institute in Lima and a German-Peruvian Cultural Institute in Arequipa. 

In education, there are close contacts and numerous bilateral university cooperations. The German Academic Exchange Service is active in the country and in 2019 nearly 1400 Peruvians studied at German universities. There are three German schools in the country and over 20 schools with German as an elective. Nearly 18,500 Peruvians learn German as a foreign language.

Diplomatic missions

 Germany has an embassy in Lima.
 Peru has an embassy in Berlin and consulates-general in Frankfurt, Hamburg and Munich.

See also
 German Peruvians
 List of ambassadors of Peru to Germany
 List of ambassadors of Germany to Peru
 List of ambassadors of Peru to Austria

Individual references

External links 

 German Foreign Office information on relations with Peru
 German-Peruvian Society

 
Peru
Bilateral relations of Peru